Friends of Women's World Banking, India, often shortened to Friends of WWB, India, or just FWWB, is an Indian APEX organization that assists microfinance and microenterprise organizations. Founded in 1982 by Ela Bhatt, it is located in Ahmedabad, Gujarat, India.

Foundation
Friends of Women's World Banking was established as a non-profit organization to promote direct participation of poor women in the economy through access to financial services. It was created to extend and expand informal credit supports and networks within India to link them to a global movement.

Outreach
FWWB-I combined its loans with technical assistance to ensure sustainable growth of microfinance institutions. From 1989 to 2010 it reached out to more than 300 institutions with technical assistance and nearly 200 with loan support. Till March 2010, FWWB-I had made a cumulative disbursement of around Rs. 11 billion benefitting 2.6 million women.

Transformation
FWWB-I, being a member of various networks, has played a significant role in the building of the sector. To expand its outreach to more institutions, FWWB-I promoted an NBFC Ananya Finance for Inclusive Growth (AFIG). FWWB-I hived off its micro finance activity to AFIG in April 2010. Ananya’s mandate is to continue to build the network of institutions that will successfully be able to balance their social mission with the commercial one. Mrs. Vijayalakshmi Das who had steered the growth of FWWB-I as an apex for the last twenty one years is now the Managing Director of Ananya Finance for Inclusive Growth.

Current activity
FWWB-I (Friends of Women's World Banking), under the leadership of Ms. Vijaylakshmi Das, will continue to work in the areas of women empowerment, strengthening community based and micro finance institutions, livelihood promotion and need based financial products and services that impact the lives of the poor. Both FWWB-I and AFIG have a common vision and goal of reaching out to larger number of low income households in the under served regions of the country.

Niche

FWWB specializes in dealing with small local lending organizations. It selects its partner organization through a rigorous screening process. But unlike commercial banks that require a credit history to assess their risk of loss, FWWB evaluates an organization on a set of parameters which includes the company's management and business systems (accounts, MIS, HR, etc.). If an organization is found that has potential to develop into a financially sustainable community development organization, it is selected as a partner.

Focus areas
1.Institution Building, Capacity Building, Monitoring and Assessment Services for Micro Finance Institutions, Community Based Organizations (Federations, Cooperatives, Producer Companies), Enterprises.
2.Supporting Partner Organizations that use innovative ways of poverty alleviation, focusing on enhancing and introducing sustainable livelihood activities for women.
3.Support for Reducing the Vulnerability of Low Income Households. This includes providing financial and technical assistance to POs for on-lending to poor women clients, to enable them to get better access to: Solar Energy Light systems, Water and Sanitation Facilities, Education Loans, Health and Hygiene Awareness, Financial Literacy

Donors and funders

Donors
Michael and Susan Dell Foundation (MSDF)
CORDAID
Citi Foundation / United Way Worldwide
Ford Foundation
Small Industries Development Bank of India (SIDBI)
Rabobank Foundation
Aide Mondiale Isc
Coutts

Funders
CORDAID
National Housing Bank (NHB)
Ford Foundation
Rabobank Foundation
Small Industries Development Bank of India (SIDBI)

External links

Microfinance organizations
Organisations based in Gujarat
1982 establishments in Gujarat
Women's organisations based in India
Organizations established in 1982